Joanne Jordan (September 5, 1920 – July 29, 2009) was an American actress and television spokesmodel. Her film credits include Loophole and Son of Sinbad.  She also portrayed Queen Mirtha on the television series "Space Patrol."

Filmography
1951: Racket Squad (TV Series)
1951: Two Tickets to Broadway - Showgirl (uncredited)
1951: Too Many Wives (Short)
1952: Aladdin and His Lamp - Harem Girl (uncredited)
1952: Lydia Bailey - Lady-in-Waiting (uncredited)
1952: Sound Off - Showgirl (uncredited)
1953: Roar of the Crowd - Secretary (uncredited)
1953: Dragnet (TV Series)
1953: The Farmer Takes a Wife - Boatwife (uncredited)
1953-1955: My Little Margie (TV Series) - Miss Hennessy
1954: The George Burns and Gracie Allen Show (TV Series) - Fran
1954: Loophole - Georgia Hoard
1954: The Pepsi-Cola Playhouse (TV Series)
1954: The Mickey Rooney Show (TV Series) - Julie
1954: Rocky Jones, Space Ranger (TV Series) - The Vonsoom
1954 Four Star Playhouse (TV Series) - Molly
1954: I Led 3 Lives (TV Series) - Martha
1955: City Detective (TV Series) - Nancy
1955: I Cover the Underworld - Joan Marlowe
1955: Son of Sinbad - Ghenia (uncredited)
1955: The Shrike - Miss Cardell (uncredited)
1955: Commando Cody: Sky Marshal of the Universe (TV Series) - Queen of Mercury
1956: The Bottom of the Bottle - Emily
1956: Written on the Wind - Brunette
1957: Jet Pilot - WAC Sergeant (uncredited) (final film role)

References

External links

1920 births
2009 deaths
Actors from Topeka, Kansas
American film actresses
American television actresses
20th-century American actresses
21st-century American actresses
Neurological disease deaths in California
Deaths from Parkinson's disease